Radnor is an unincorporated community and census-designated place (CDP) in central Radnor Township, Delaware County, Ohio, United States.  As of the 2010 census it had a population of 201. Radnor has a post office with the ZIP code of 43066. It lies along State Route 203 at its intersection with Radnor Road.

Demographics

History
Radnor was originally known as "Delhi", and under the latter name was laid out in 1833. Prior to being called Delhi, the town was called New Baltimore.  New Baltimore existed as early as 1814.   The present name was taken from Radnor Township.

References

Unincorporated communities in Delaware County, Ohio
Welsh-American culture in Ohio
Unincorporated communities in Ohio